Chapeltown Barracks was a military installation in Chapeltown, Leeds, England, situated on the north and south sides of Barrack Road.

History
The barracks were constructed by Craven and Co. in 1820. They were largely used by cavalry regiments until the 1880s by which time they were in a poor state of repair. It was from about that time that the cavalry school was used by elements of the Leeds Rifles, a Volunteer Force regiment. The Leeds Rifles moved to the Army Reserve Centre at Harewood Barracks in 1967 and the barracks were largely demolished in 1988.

References

Barracks in England
Installations of the British Army
Demolished buildings and structures in England
Buildings and structures demolished in 1988